Tómas Þórður Hilmarsson (born 11 January 1995) is an Icelandic basketball player who last played for Aquimisa Carbajosa in the Spanish LEB Plata and the Icelandic national team.

Playing career
Tómas debuted with Stjarnan in the Úrvalsdeild karla during the 2010–2011 season. In February 2015, he won the Icelandic Cup with Stjarnan despite playing with a broken glass in his heel. In 2016 he joined Francis Marion University but returned to Stjarnan in December the same year. During the 2017–2018 season, he averaged a career high 14.7 points and 9.0 rebounds in 22 games.

In July 2020, Tómas signed with Aquimisa Carbajosa of the Spanish LEB Plata. He left the team in end of January 2021 and returned to Iceland. In 14 games, he averaged 6.1 points and 5.1 rebounds per game.

In February 2021, Tómas returned to Stjarnan. On 19 March 2022, he won his fifth Icelandic Basketball Cup when Stjarnan defeated reigning national champions Þór Þorlákshöfn in the 2022 Cup Finals.

National team career
In November 2017, Tómas was selected to the Icelandic national team for the first time.

Honours

Titles
Icelandic Cup (2013, 2015, 2019, 2020, 2022)
Icelandic Company Cup (2015)

References

External sites
Icelandic statistics at kki.is
Spanish statistics
Profile at Eurobasket.com

1995 births
Living people
Tómas Þórður Hilmarsson
Tómas Þórður Hilmarsson
Tómas Þórður Hilmarsson
Tómas Þórður Hilmarsson
Tómas Þórður Hilmarsson